One Night in with Hope and More Vol. 2 is an album by jazz pianist Roberto Magris released on the JMood label in 2013, featuring performances by the Roberto Magris Trio with Elisa Pruett and Albert “Tootie” Heath (2009 session), and with Elisa Pruett and Brian Steever (2010 session).

Reception

The All About Jazz review by Edward Blanco awarded the album 4½ stars and simply states: "The Roberto Magris Trio forges a remarkable musical statement on One Night in with Hope and More Vol. 2 , revisiting and reviving the wonderful music of jazz pianists and bebop masters of the past, with a classic performance and masterful play from one of the best bebop jazz pianist of today." The All About Jazz review by C. Michael Bailey awarded the album 4 stars and simply states: "Magris closes out his long night of recording hard bop in the vein of Hope with a collection containing compositions by Herbie Nichols, Randy Weston, as well as several original pieces in the chosen vernacular. Magris' approach remains straight-ahead, seasoned with his potent and well-trained playing."

Track listing
 Third World (Herbie Nichols) - 5:21 
 Young and Foolish (Albert Hague) - 8:50 
 Makanda (Roberto Magris) - 5:04 
 Dianna (Ken McIntyre) - 4:45 
 Mal Waldron's Dreams (Roberto Magris) - 6:24 
 Little Susan (Randy Weston) - 3:42 
 Theme from the “Odd Couple” (Neal Hefti) - 6:35 
 Burbank Turnaround (Roberto Magris) - 4:25 
 I Can't Give You Anything But Love (Fields/McHugh) - 5:28 
 Bonus track: Possessed Me (Roberto Magris) - 7:56 
 Audio Notebook - 4:25

Personnel

Musicians
Roberto Magris - piano
Elisa Pruett - bass
Albert “Tootie” Heath - drums (on 1, 5, 7, 8, 9)
Brian Steever – drums (on 2, 3, 4, 6)
''' on the bonus track
Paul Carr – tenor sax
Roberto Magris – piano
Elisa Pruett – bass
Idris Muhammad – drums

Production
 Paul Collins – executive producer and producer
 George Hunt – engineering
 Samur Khouja and Eric Corne – engineering (bonus track)
 Stephen Bocioaca – design
 Jerry Lockett and Martin Magris – photography

References

2013 albums
Roberto Magris albums